Azagny virus (AZGV) is an Orthohantavirus found in West African pygmy shrews. The virus was named after the Azagny National Park, where some sample collecting occurred.

References

Hantaviridae